The Metro Spirit, now defunct, was a free alternative news weekly in Augusta, Georgia (USA) covering local entertainment, events and culture. The paper was widely available at newsstands across the Augusta area with an estimated circulation of 19,000 at its peak. The publication became a member of the Association of Alternative Newsmedia (AAN), a group of newspapers and magazines across the U.S. providing journalism that offers an alternative to local mainstream media, in 2007 with the editorial team led by Editor- Tom Grant.

Originally monikered “Metropolitan Spirit”, the paper was launched in 1989 by local entrepreneur David Vantrease. Following a purchase by Portico Publications out of Charlottesville, VA in 2003, the publication was rebranded and published under several different acting publishers based in Augusta during its tenure: Joe White, Amber Carlson, Bryan Osborne, and Matt Plocha. Then with no Augusta based publisher, the paper was ran out of the Charlottesville headquarters, with staff working locally in Augusta. On March 2, 2011, publishing was suspended by Portico, citing lack of financial performance. The Spirit resumed publishing April 14, under former publisher turned owner, Joe White. It operated in print for several years and eventually moved to digital format only, where editors opined on local happenings. The outlet's last story post appears to have been shared on Facebook in December 2020.

The paper launched a website around 1996, which is now inactive.

See also

Media in Augusta, Georgia

References

External links
Official website

Mass media in Augusta, Georgia
Alternative weekly newspapers published in the United States
Free newspapers